The Afghanistan 1979–1989 War Memorial is a monument in Kyiv (Kiev), the capital of Ukraine, commemorating soldiers who died fighting during the War in Afghanistan, after Soviet forces invaded that country in 1979. Unveiled in 1994, the memorial is located halfway between the Pechersk Lavra and the Museum of The History of Ukraine in World War II.

References

Monuments and memorials in Kyiv
Works about the Soviet–Afghan War
Afghanistan-Iraq War memorials